The 1989 Southeast Asian Games, officially known as the 15th Southeast Asian Games, was a multi-sport event held in Kuala Lumpur, Malaysia from 20 to 31 August 1989 with 25 sports featured in the games. It was officially opened by 9th Yang di-Pertuan Agong, Sultan Azlan Shah. Although Cambodia did not participate, Laos returned to compete for the first time under the new federation name in this edition of the games, while Vietnam fields their own delegation to the event for the first time as a unified country.

The closing ceremony of this regional meet coincides with the 32nd anniversary of Malaysia's independence. This was the fourth time that Malaysia played as hosts to these games, the country had previously hosted the event in 1965 and 1971, when the event was still known as the Southeast Asian Peninsular (SEAP) Games at those times, and in 1977, in which this edition was the first to bear the games' present name, which reflects the admission of Brunei, Indonesia, and the Philippines to the Southeast Asian Games during that year.

The games was opened and closed by Sultan Azlan Shah, the King of Malaysia at the Stadium Merdeka. The final medal tally was led by Indonesia, followed by host Malaysia and Thailand.

Venues
 Stadium Merdeka, Kuala Lumpur - Opening/Closing ceremony, Athletics, Football (final)
 Stadium Negara - Basketball, Badminton
 Cheras Aquatic Centre - Swimming
 Cheras stadium - Football
 Veledrome Rakyat - Cycling (track)
 Subang Shooting Range - Shooting
 BSN Stadium, Bangi - Football
 Kent Bowl, Asiajaya, Petaling Jaya - Bowling

Marketing

Sponsors

 Panasonic
 Coca-Cola
 IBM Mesiniaga
 Magnum Corporation
 Milo
 Malaysia Airlines
 Fujifilm
 Asics
 Seiko
 Genting Group
 Telekom Malaysia
 Aliph
 Sports Toto

Mascot
The official 1989 SEA Games mascot was an anthropomorphic turtle named Johan.

Logo
The logo for the Games features 6 elliptical rings alternately colored red and blue to form a shape that resembles a spinning top, or locally called gasing.

Songs
"Reach for the sky" ("Kini Saatnya" in Malay) was the official theme song of the 1989 Southeast Asian Games. It was sung in English by Francissca Peter and in Malay by Jay Jay.

The games

Participating nations

 
 
 
  (Host)'

Sports

 Aquatics

Medal table
A total of 957 medals, comprising 303 Gold medals, 302 Silver medals and 352 Bronze medals were awarded to athletes. The host Malaysia's performance was their best ever yet in Southeast Asian Games History and were placed only second to Indonesia as overall champion.
Key

References

External links
 History of the SEA Games

 
Southeast Asian Games
1989 in multi-sport events
1989 in Malaysian sport
International sports competitions hosted by Malaysia
Multi-sport events in Malaysia
Southeast Asian Games
Sport in Kuala Lumpur
1980s in Kuala Lumpur